The Evolution may refer to:
Ciara: The Evolution, 2006, or its title song
The Evolution (Made Men Music Group album), 2014
The Evolution (Crossfaith song), from Apocalyze, 2013

See also
Evolution (disambiguation)